Jiaozhuang Township (焦庄乡) may refer to two locations in China:

 Jiaozhuang Township, Hebei, in Nanshi District, Baoding
 Jiaozhuang Township, Henan, in Xiping County